The Girl from Acker Street is a 1920 German silent drama film directed by Reinhold Schünzel and starring Otto Gebühr, Lilly Flohr, and Rosa Valetti. It was followed by two sequels directed by Werner Funck and Martin Hartwig respectively.

The film's sets were designed by the art director Fritz Seyffert.

Cast

References

Bibliography

External links

1920 films
Films of the Weimar Republic
German silent feature films
Films directed by Reinhold Schünzel
German black-and-white films
1920 drama films
German drama films
Silent drama films
1920s German films